"Another Day" is a song by Irish rock band U2. It was commercially released as a single on 26 February 1980 by CBS Ireland as a follow-up to the band's first release, the EP U2-3.

Recording
"Another Day" was recorded by U2 at CBS Studios in London at No. 31-37 Whitfield Street, W1, in December 1979 during a mini-tour of the city, which comprised their first live performances outside of Ireland. It was produced by the CBS talent scout Chas de Whalley. and engineered by Walter Samuel.

The B-side is an early version of the song "Twilight", recorded by the band with the sound engineer Dave Freely at the Eamonn Andrews Studios in Dublin in a 15-minute demo session in February 1979, which would later be re-recorded for inclusion on its first album Boy (1980).

Release
The single was released on 26 February 1980 exclusively in Ireland in a small scale pressing but failed to enter the Irish Singles Chart. In 2008, the song was included in the deluxe editions of the reissue of Boy.

Live performances
The song is known to have been played at six concerts (twice on 11 May 1980, for a total of 7 occasions). Its last known performance was on 27 July 1980 at Leixlip Castle, County Kildare in Ireland.

Track listing

Notes

References

External links
Discography entry at U2songs.com – Comprehensive details on various editions, cover scans, lyrics, and more.
Another Day's performance history at U2-Vertigo-Tour.com – Lists all concerts at which "Another Day" is known to have been performed.
Twilight's performance history at U2-Vertigo-Tour.com – Lists all concerts at which "Twilight" is known to have been performed.
Lyrics of this song

1980 debut singles
U2 songs
Columbia Records singles
Songs written by Bono
Songs written by the Edge
Songs written by Adam Clayton
Songs written by Larry Mullen Jr.
1979 songs